The Tișovița is a small left tributary of the river Danube in Romania. It flows into the Danube near Eibenthal, between Dubova and Svinița.

References

Rivers of Romania
Rivers of Mehedinți County